Lauri "Tahko" Pihkala (born Gummerus, 5 January 1888 – 20 May 1981) was the inventor of pesäpallo, the Finnish variant of baseball. In 1969 he became one of the first persons to receive an honorary doctorate in Sport Sciences from the University of Jyväskylä, together with president Urho Kekkonen and Professor Kaarina Kari.

Athletics 

In the 1910s he became the first Finnish professional coach in athletics, and also worked as a physical education instructor with the Finnish Army.

Pihkala was known for being an avid sports fan, and he developed several outdoor games.

Other 

During the Finnish Civil War he was responsible for propaganda in the White Guard flying unit "Devils of Kuhmoinen" of major Hans Kalm.

Pihkala's brother Martti Pihkala was a right-wing political activist. Lauri Pihkala didn't write any political texts in his publications. He tried to integrate Finnish working class to the society and hoped that sports could be one tool there.

Some writers claim that Pihkala should be responsible for a massacre in Harmoinen village in March 1918. This is not true. The murderers belonged to Devils of Kuhmoinen, but Pihkala was not present there.

Memorial of Pihkala by sculptor Nina Sailo was unveiled in 1988 on the south-east side of the Helsinki Olympic Stadium.

References

External links

Lauri Pihkala in 375 humanists 6.1.2015, Faculty of Arts, University of Helsinki
List of Finnish athletes 1906–1912

1888 births
1981 deaths
People from Pihtipudas
People from Vaasa Province (Grand Duchy of Finland)
Finnish baseball players
Finnish male high jumpers
Finnish male discus throwers
Finnish male middle-distance runners
Olympic athletes of Finland
People of the Finnish Civil War (White side)
Athletes (track and field) at the 1908 Summer Olympics
Athletes (track and field) at the 1912 Summer Olympics
Olympic male high jumpers
Finnish officers
Sportspeople from Central Finland